The Bentley Falcons football team represents Bentley University in NCAA Division II college football.

Coaches
 Hal Kopp (1972–1975)
 Jack Regan (1976–1978)
 Peter Yetten (1979–2008)
 Thom Boerman (2009–2013)
 Bill Kavanaugh (2014–2021)
 Alvin Reynolds (2022– )

Notable players
Mackenzy Bernadeau, '08, professional football player who was last with the Jacksonville Jaguars organization; drafted 250th overall in 2008 NFL Draft by the Carolina Panthers

Playoff appearances

NCAA Division II
Bentley has made three appearances in the NCAA Division II playoffs, with a combined record of 0-3.

References

External links
 

 
American football teams established in 1972
1972 establishments in Massachusetts